ColdSpring is a web application framework for the ColdFusion application programming language, based on the Java Spring Framework. It was originally created by Dave Ross and Chris Scott. The framework provides Dependency injection, inversion of control and aspect-oriented programming design pattern capabilities in an effort to make the configuration and dependencies of ColdFusion components (CFCs) easier to manage.

Integration 
A noted strength of ColdSpring is its ability to provide complementary services to other applications and frameworks. ColdSpring has been deeply embedded within the core of the Model-Glue framework since Model-Glue 2.0. Also, Fusebox since 5.0 ships with a ColdSpring-specific lexicon.

In reverse, ColdSpring ships with connection points for Model-Glue, Mach-II and the unit testing framework CFCUnit.

History 
ColdSpring historically had a long development and release cycle when compared to other ColdFusion frameworks. ColdSpring was first mentioned by Dave Ross when he released a pre-alpha version on February 9, 2005. Interest was found quickly within the ColdFusion community and a support group was formed around the software later in 2005, as was the ColdSpring Framework web site. Eventually, a release candidate was released June 2, 2006.

ColdSpring 1.0 
June 25, 2006 ColdSpring 1.0 was finally released just three days before CFUnited where Dave Ross was scheduled to speak on the topic.

ColdSpring 1.2 
September 12, 2008 The 1.2 release included changes to make working with beans, especially when using the XML Bean Factory, much easier, including creating bean aliases, including other bean configuration files, creating collections within the configuration file and other fixes.

References

External links
 ColdSpring Framework
 Manage dependency injection for ColdFusion with the ColdSpring framework by Brian Kotek
 Using the ColdSpring Dependency Injection Framework for ColdFusion

Web frameworks
CFML programming language